Fleshmarket Close is a 2004 crime novel by Ian Rankin, and is named after a real close in Edinburgh between the High Street and Market Street, crossing Cockburn Street. It is the fifteenth of the Inspector Rebus novels. "Fleshmarket" is the Scots term for butcher's market. It was released in the US under the title Fleshmarket Alley. The novel was the basis for the second episode in the second Rebus television series starring Ken Stott which was aired in 2006.

Plot summary

Detective Inspector John Rebus has no desk to work from, as a hint from his superiors that he should consider retirement, but he and his protégée Siobhan Clarke are still investigating some seemingly unconnected cases. The sister of a dead rape victim is missing; skeletons turn up embedded in a concrete floor; a Kurdish journalist is brutally murdered; and the son of a Glasgow gangster has moved into the Edinburgh vice scene.

The book uses two new settings: a sink estate divided between the indigenous population and refugees (based on Wester Hailes), and a small town whose economy is dominated by an internment camp for asylum seekers (based on Dungavel).

2004 British novels
Inspector Rebus novels
Royal Mile
Novels set in Edinburgh
Orion Books books